Domino Theory is the twelfth studio album by jazz fusion band Weather Report, released in February 1984. It is the second studio album to feature the Hakim-Bailey-Rossy rhythm section. In actuality, three tracks are using live recorded source.

The title of the album is a reference towards the American geopolitical theory of the same name which gained popularity between the 1950s and 1980s.

Track listing 
All tracks composed by Joe Zawinul, except where indicated.

"Can It Be Done" (Wilson Tee) – 4:02
"D Flat Waltz" – 11:10
"The Peasant" – 8:16
"Predator" (Wayne Shorter) – 5:21
"Blue Sound - Note 3" – 6:52
"Swamp Cabbage" (Wayne Shorter) – 5:22
"Domino Theory" – 6:09

Personnel 
Weather Report
 Josef 'Joe' Erich Zawinul - keyboards and synthesizers
 Wayne Shorter - saxophones
 Omar Hakim - drums
 Victor Bailey - bass
 José Rossy - percussion
 Carl Anderson - vocals (track 1)

Production
 Bernie Fromm - engineer
 Mitch Gibson - engineer
 Tom Suzuki - engineer
 Larry Ferguson - assistant engineer
 Tony Lane - cover design
 Nancy Donald - cover design

References

External links 

Weather Report Annotated Discography: Domino Theory

1984 albums
Columbia Records albums
Weather Report albums